Jónhard Frederiksberg (born 27 August 1980) is a Faroese international footballer who plays club football for Skála ÍF as a striker.

References

External links

1980 births
Living people
Faroese footballers
Faroe Islands international footballers
Skála ÍF players

Association football forwards